Prawit and Pravit are romanizations of the Thai masculine given names  and  (which are homophones). People with the name include:

Prawit Wongsuwon, military general and politician
Prawit Prariwanta, footballer
Pravit Rojanaphruk, journalist
Pravit Wasoontra, footballer
Pravit Suwanwichit, boxer

Thai masculine given names